Omobranchus loxozonus is a species of combtooth blenny found in the northwest Pacific ocean, around southern Japan.

References

loxozonus
Taxa named by David Starr Jordan
Taxa named by Edwin Chapin Starks
Fish described in 1906